The National Tutoring Association is an American non-profit organization that certifies and trains tutors.To date, the NTA has certified over 14,000 tutors.

References

Educational organizations based in the United States